Louisa Finch, Countess of Aylesford (née Thynne; 25 March 1760 – 28 December 1832) was an English naturalist and botanical illustrator who made studies and paintings of the plants, algae, and fungi from the Warwickshire area.

Life 
She was born the eldest daughter of the politician Thomas Thynne, 1st Marquess of Bath, and his wife, the former Lady Elizabeth Bentinck. In 1781 she married Heneage Finch, 4th Earl of Aylesford. She had thirteen children, including Heneage Finch, 5th Earl of Aylesford. She was widowed in 1812. In 1816, she leased Stanmore Park House, Stanmore, Middlesex: the site is now a housing estate, Lady Aylesford Avenue. She died at the age of 72 at the family home of Packington Hall.

Botany
Upon settling in Warwickshire. Lady Aylesford took to studying the region's flora. She produced over 2,800 botanical watercolour drawings and was a correspondent of botanists such as William Withering, W. T. Bree, and George Don. Additionally, she documented about 30 first records of plants from Warwickshire. She also amassed an extensive collection of minerals, which was acquired by Henry Heuland after her death. Her plants are collected in Oxford University, and her minerals and manuscripts in the Natural History Museum.

Marriage and issue 
Lady Louisa married Heneage Finch, 4th Earl of Aylesford, on 18 November 1781. They lived at Packington Hall near Meriden, Warwickshire and had thirteen children:

 Charles Finch, Lord Guernsey (d. 18 July 1784)
 Heneage Finch, 5th Earl of Aylesford (1786–1859)
 Hon. Daniel Finch (25 February 1789 – 17 January 1868), artist.
 Lady Frances Finch (c. 1791 – 12 July 1886), unmarried
 Hon. Edward Finch (1792 – 9 April 1830)
 Lieutenant-General the Hon. John Finch (1793 – 25 November 1861), married in 1835 Katherine Ellice (d. 1872)
 Hon. Henry Finch (1795–1829)
 Lady Charlotte Finch (d. 17 January 1869), married Charles Palmer on 22 January 1823.
 Hon. Charles Finch (b. 1799)
 Lady Mary Finch (d. 24 July 1823)
 Lady Elizabeth Finch (d. 1 June 1879)
 Lady Henrietta Finch (d. 1828)
 Lady Caroline Finch (d. 1821)

Arms

References

1760 births
1832 deaths
18th-century English painters
19th-century English painters
18th-century English women artists
19th-century English women artists
18th-century naturalists
19th-century naturalists
Botanical illustrators
Aylesford
Daughters of British marquesses
English naturalists
English watercolourists
English women painters
Louisa Finch
Women watercolorists